Bom Jesus is a municipality in the state of Rio Grande do Sul, Brazil. Its population was approximately 11,309 in 2020.

The city is one of the coldest in Brazil, and snowfall is not uncommon.

Climate

References

Municipalities in Rio Grande do Sul